Lucio Colletti (8 December 1924, Rome – 3 November 2001, Venturina Terme, Campiglia Marittima, Province of Livorno) was an Italian Western Marxist philosopher. Colletti started to be known outside Italy because of a long interview with him that Marxist historian Perry Anderson published in the New Left Review in 1974.

Biography
Inspired by the Western Marxist philosopher Galvano Della Volpe, he then gravitated towards communism. Colletti was well known as a critic of Hegelian idealism and later became a noted critic of Marxism. He wrote the foreword for the Italian edition of Alfred Schmidt's The Concept of Nature in Marx.

Colletti changed his political beliefs very often and abandoned many of his early Marxist ideals. Having been a member of the anti-fascist Action Party (Partito d'Azione; PdA) in his youth, he joined the Italian Communist Party (PCI) in 1949 and emerged as an important cultural party figure. In 1964, Coletti left the PCI because the party's break with its semi-Stalinist past was leading towards what he called, in his view, a "patently rightward direction." In the 1970s he was among the supporters of Socialist leader Bettino Craxi. From 1996 until his death he was elected on the list of Forza Italia, Silvio Berlusconi's right-wing political party, as a member of the Chamber of Deputies (lower house) in the Italian parliament.

Selected publications
 The Manifesto of 101
 "The Theory of the Crash". Telos, 13 (Fall 1972). New York: Telos Press.
 1972 (1974) From Rousseau to Lenin
 1973 (1979) Marxism and Hegel

Notes

References

External links
 English-language obituary from The Guardian (UK)

1924 births
2001 deaths
20th-century Italian philosophers
21st-century Italian philosophers
20th-century Italian politicians
Former Marxists
Italian communists
Italian Marxists
Italian political philosophers
Marxist theorists
Marxist writers
People from the Province of Livorno
Forza Italia politicians
Deutscher Memorial Prize winners